Jeff Zelinski (born September 16, 1982) is a former Canadian football defensive back. He played CIS Football at Saint Mary's, where he played cornerback. He was selected in the fifth round (40th overall) of the 2008 CFL Draft by the Saskatchewan Roughriders.

Zelinski was selected a second-team CIS all-Canadian in 2007 and 2008.  As well as a First-team All-Canadian in 2009.

External links
"CFL Draft: Zelinski has something to prove"

1982 births
Living people
Saint Mary's Huskies football players
Canadian football defensive backs
Saskatchewan Roughriders players
Players of Canadian football from British Columbia